Season 5 of Dana White's Contender Series will commence in August 2021 and in the US would be exclusive to ESPN+, ESPN's new over-the-top subscription package.

Week 1 - August 31

Contract awards 
The following fighters were awarded contracts with the UFC:
Azamat Murzakanov, Joanderson Brito, Victor Altamirano, Carlos Candelario, and AJ Fletcher

Week 2 - September 7

Contract awards 
The following fighters were awarded contracts with the UFC:

Josh Quinlan, Chidi Njokuani, Saimon Oliveira, C.J. Vergara, and Chad Anheliger

Week 3 - September 14

Contract awards 
The following fighters were awarded contracts with the UFC:
Jailton Almeida, Albert Duraev, Łukasz Brzeski, Jack Della Maddalena, and Jasmine Jasudavicius

Week 4 - September 21

Contract awards 
The following fighters were awarded contracts with the UFC:
AJ Dobson, Michael Morales, Kleydson Rodrigues, and Victor Martinez

Week 5 - September 28

Contract awards 
The following fighters were awarded contracts with the UFC:
Igor Poterya and Daniel Zellhuber

Week 6 - October 5

Contract awards 
The following fighters were awarded contracts with the UFC:

 Mike Malott, Carlos Hernandez, Fernie Garcia, and Genaro Valdéz

Week 7 - October 12

Contract awards 
The following fighters were awarded contracts with the UFC:

Martin Buday, Jake Hadley, and Vyacheslav Borshchev

Week 8 - October 19

Contract awards 
The following fighters were awarded contracts with the UFC:
Jonny Parsons, Piera Rodríguez, Caio Borralho, and Armen Petrosyan

Week 9 - October 26

Contract awards 
The following fighters were awarded contracts with the UFC:

 Gadzhi Omargadzhiev, Christian Quiñonez, Javid Basharat, Karine Silva, and Manuel Torres

Week 10 - November 2

Contract awards 
The following fighters were awarded contracts with the UFC:
 Maheshate and Yohan Lainesse

References

Ultimate Fighting Championship television series